Hisatoshi (written:  or ) is a masculine Japanese given name. Notable people with the name include:

, Japanese long-distance runner
, Japanese field hockey player

Japanese masculine given names